Perrierosedum is a genus of succulent plants of the family Crassulaceae that is endemic to Madagascar and contains only the single species Perrierosedum madagascariense.

The genus name of Perrierosedum is in honour of Joseph Marie Henry Alfred Perrier de la Bâthie (1873–1958), a French botanist who specialized in the plants of Madagascar. It was first described and published in J. Fac. Sci. Univ. Tokyo, Sect. 3, Bot. Vol.12 on page 166 in 1978.

References

Crassulaceae
Monotypic Saxifragales genera
Crassulaceae genera
Taxa named by Alwin Berger
Plants described in 1978
Endemic flora of Madagascar